The 1991 Mid-Continent Conference men's basketball tournament was held March 3–5, 1991 in Green Bay, Wisconsin.[2] This was the eighth edition of the tournament for the AMCU-8/Mid-Con, now known as the Summit League.

Bracket

References

1990–91 Mid-Continent Conference men's basketball season
Summit League men's basketball tournament
1991 in sports in Wisconsin